Ben Harper called "Beanie" in his youth, was a character in the now-defunct American soap opera, Love of Life. As a child, he was played by Dennis Parnell and Tommy White, and as an adult, he was played by Christopher Reeve, in his first role; and Chandler Hill Harben.

The son of Meg
Ben was the only child born of Charles Harper and his scheming conniving wife, Meg Dale. He grew up in New York City.

Because of her selfishness, and her propensity of going after every rich, shady and vindictive man in New York City, Ben was left alone a lot of the time. His mother starved him of love, and had it not been for his aunt, Vanessa Dale, he would not have known what love was.

Ben was taken by Meg after a failed paternity suit she filed against a lawyer she had been having an affair with; and they left for parts unknown.

After seventeen years of being incommunicado elapsed, Ben had returned. His personality had been warped after all the years of neglect by his mother, and he was now a handsome tennis bum.

He was very money-grubbing, much like his mother was before she became rich. He was also quite vindictive. He helped manufacture fake photos against his step uncle, Bruce which ensured his mother's husband, at the time, Jeff Hart would win a mayoral election. However, in the next election, Bruce would defeat Jeff.

His mother wanted him to marry a nice girl, and she thought the choice of Betsy Crawford, a friend of his half-sister, Cal, was perfect.

However, what nobody in Rosehill knew was that Ben was a bigamist. He was already married to a woman named Arlene Lovett. Arlene would sit back idly, because once Ben and Betsy were married, Meg would give him a half-million dollars outright.

But Meg, (as well as Arlene's own mother, Carrie Johnson Lovett, (Peg Murray) who was a friend of Betsy's) knew that her son was up to no good, and decided to amend the rules of his dowry. She fixed it so that he would have to be a good husband to Betsy for six months.

Meanwhile, Arlene, who, despite her scheming and vampy ways, was very decent and good natured, would wisely divorce Ben, and would become a friend of David Hart (Brian Farrell), during his mental collapse after murdering his hateful father, Jeff; and then she would later marry a reformed loan shark, Ray Slater (Lloyd Battista).

As was bound to happen, the whole story came out, and Ben confessed to everything, the bigamy; the lies, the conniving. What was noble about it, was that he took all the blame on himself, and spared Arlene any humiliation, which she appreciated.

He eventually went to prison for his crimes, (while there, it was alleged that he was male raped in Prison, the first time the issue had even been broached in Daytime television) and Betsy, quite understandably, was truly furious with him, although she did eventually come around; forgave him, and gave birth to their daughter, Suzanne Harper. She would not remarry him, however.

It was toward Suzanne, however, that Meg committed what was considered the first ever utterance of profanity in daytime television. In a fit of familial rage, Meg tore into Ben, and browbeat him, in the process, calling Ben's daughter a "bastard". This only reflected more against Meg, who had been the main villain since Love of Life debuted in 1951. She was angry with him, but more so with herself, as she was so blinded by her selfishness that she was unable to mother her son when he was younger.

Ben endured many more travails after that, including a car accident that lost a family a son; and Betsy, whom he truly loved, marrying a jealous lawyer Elliot Lang (Ted LePlat). But, he was quite determined to put his sordid and painful past behind him and reform. As the show ended, it was shown that he had, for the most part, succeeded in doing so.

Harper, Ben "Beanie"